Alyssa Whitall "Alys" Pearsall Smith (21 July 1867 – 22 January 1951) was an American-born British Quaker relief organiser and the first wife of Bertrand Russell. She chaired the society that created an innovative school for mothers in 1907.

Early life

Pearsall Smith was born in Philadelphia, Pennsylvania. She was the daughter of Robert Pearsall Smith and Hannah Whitall Smith, prominent figures in the Holiness movement in America and the Higher Life movement in Great Britain. She was the sister of essayist and critic Logan Pearsall Smith and the cousin of Martha Carey Thomas. Pearsall Smith graduated from Bryn Mawr College near Philadelphia.

Pearsall Smith's family lived in England from 1873 to 1875 and then again from 1888 onward. In England, the family came into contact with George Bernard Shaw, Henry James, and Bernard Berenson, who married her sister, Mary.

Personal life
On 13 December 1894, Smith married Bertrand Russell, son of the Viscount and Viscountess Amberley in the Quaker Meeting House in St. Martin's Lane, London, England. They separated in 1911 and divorced in 1921.

Alys, who never remarried, died in London on 22 January 1951.

Volunteer work
Pearsall Smith chaired the Italian Refugees' Relief Committee to help people fleeing Benito Mussolini's Italy.

Pearsall Smith also chaired the general committee of the St Pancras Mothers' and Infants' Society, which set up a School for Mothers (also known as Mothers' & Babies' Welcome) in Charlton Street, London, N.W. in 1907. This centre provided a range of services aimed at reducing infant mortality, such as weighing babies, providing expectant and nursing mothers with meals, and medical and mothering advice. The vice-chair was Adele Meyer, who largely funded the enterprise.

Pearsall Smith was said to be involved in the women's suffrage activism during 1908.

References 

American Quakers
English Quakers
1867 births
1951 deaths
People from Philadelphia
American expatriates in England
American social activists
Bertrand Russell